M. M. Nazrul Islam (16 October 1943 – 17 September 1992) was a Bangladeshi academic and politician from Bhola belonging to Bangladesh Awami League. He was elected twice as a member of the Jatiya Sangsad. He was the father of Abdullah Al Islam Jakob.

Biography
Nazrul Islam was born on 17 October 1943 at Chandpur in Lamohan of Bhola. After completing primary, secondary and higher secondary studies he graduated from Brojomohun College in 1964. Later, he received postgraduate degree in economics from University of Dhaka in 1966.

Nazrul Islam was a teacher of Kashimpur High School of Barisal and Dularhat High School of Char Fasson. Later, he joined Char Fasson T. B. High School as the headmaster of that institution. In 1968 he joined Char Fasson College as the founding principal of that institution. He was an organizer of the Liberation War of Bangladesh.

Nazrul Islam was elected as a member of the Jatiya Sangsad from Bakerganj-3 in 1979. Later, he was elected as member of the Jatiya Sangsad from Bhola-4 in 1991.

Nazrul Islam died on 17 September 1992 at a hospital in Dhaka at the age of 48.

References

1943 births
1992 deaths
People from Bhola District
Bangladeshi educators
2nd Jatiya Sangsad members
5th Jatiya Sangsad members
Awami League politicians
University of Dhaka alumni
People of the Bangladesh Liberation War